Molodezhny is a village in the Karaganda Region, Kazakhstan. It is part of the Molodezhny rural district (KATO code - 355657100). Molodezhny was established in 1962 during the construction of the Irtysh–Karaganda Canal. There is a coal mine in the town. Population:

Geography
Molodezhny is located by the western bank of the Irtysh–Karaganda Canal. The Karaganda — Pavlodar highway passes through Molodezhny.

References

External links
Коллектив угольного разреза «Молодежный» - празднует 30-летие (in Russian)

Populated places in Karaganda Region

kk:Молодежный (Қарағанды облысы)